Reşadiye is a village in Tarsus district of Mersin Province, Turkey. It is situated in Çukurova plains (Cilicia of the antiquity) to the east of Tarsus and is very close to Tarsus. The population of Reşadiye was 293 as of 2012. Various agricultural crops are produced in the village, the most pronounced crops being grapes and cotton.

References

Villages in Tarsus District